East Lyme is a town in New London County, Connecticut, United States. The population was 18,693 at the 2020 census. The villages of Niantic and Flanders are located in the town.

Geography
East Lyme is located in southern New London County, west of Waterford and Montville, east of Lyme and Old Lyme, and south of Salem. Long Island Sound is to the south.

Villages
The town consists primarily of two villages, Flanders and Niantic. It is common for the town of East Lyme to be erroneously called "Niantic", due to this side of town being the "beach" side which is popular with tourists and visitors in the summer months. Niantic's population doubles in the summer months for the beach season, and it has a much higher density than the more sparsely populated Flanders side of town, which is known for its apple orchards, the town's high school, and the forest.

Niantic

The village of Niantic gets its name from the Niantic or Nehantic people, whose ranging grounds once extended from Wecapaug Brook, in what is now Rhode Island, to the Connecticut River. Shortly before the first settlers arrived, the Pequots had invaded Nehantic territory and annexed about half of the land claimed by the tribe. According to local historian Olive Tubbs Chendali:
It was the construction of the railroad in 1851 that lured people to the shoreline which up to this time had been known - not as Niantic - but as "The Bank". Long before this time, however, as evidenced by The Diary of Joshua Hempstead - 1711 - 1758 it was known as "Nahantick" "Nyantick" or "Nehantic", the home territory of the Nehantic Indians.

Sportfishing and marinas dominate the village's industry along with summer tourism and restaurant trade. Strong regional businesses include seafood restaurants and hotels/motels serving the town's beaches and the casinos at Foxwoods and Mohegan Sun. Rocky Neck State Park features camping, swimming and picnic areas along with numerous marinas and sportfishing companies.

The Niantic Bay Boardwalk is a one-mile (1.6 km) long walkway that runs parallel to Amtrak’s shoreline railroad tracks and spans Niantic Bay from the Niantic River inlet to Hole-in-the-Wall municipal beach. It first opened to the public in 2005, but was closed from about 2011 due to a combination of Amtrak building a new railroad bridge across the Niantic River, which required a re-positioning of the approach tracks, and damage caused by Hurricane Irene in October 2011. The boardwalk fully re-opened to the public in March 2016.

The Children's Museum of Southeastern Connecticut is located in East Lyme's original public library on Main Street. The museum is aimed primarily at children ages infant to ten years old. The current public library is located on Society Road, away from Niantic.

The village of Niantic includes the beach communities of Attawan Beach, Black Point, Crescent Beach, Giants Neck Beach, Giants Neck Heights, Oak Grove Beach, Old Black Point, Pine Grove, and Saunder's Point.

Flanders
The village of Flanders, originally a farming area along the Old Post Road, gets its name from the development of woolen mills similar to that in Flanders, Belgium. The heart of the village is located at Flanders Four Corners at the intersection of Chesterfield Road (Route 161) and Boston Post Road (Route 1). This area is the site of many small stores and businesses, as well as East Lyme High School, Flanders Elementary School, and the Board of Education.

Flanders was the original center of East Lyme society with dozens of 18th century homes, shops and public inns situated along the Boston Post Road until the early 1800s. It lost its pre-eminence as Niantic began to flourish, first with the growth of commercial fishing and then with the construction of the Shore Line Railway. Many of the original Flanders homes have been lost as a result of the construction of Interstate 95 in the 1950s and subsequent commercial construction at the Four Corners area. For example, the old Caulkins Tavern stood at the site of the current CVS and was a well-traveled and documented stopping place in the 18th century from none other than Sarah Kemble Knight in her diary, as well as General George Washington, who stopped here with thousands of troops in 1776. Some homes remain closer to the Waterford line at the site of the old Beckwith Shipyard at the head of the Niantic River.

Other minor communities
Golden Spur is a community located at the head of the Niantic River, which earned it its other name, "Head of the River". In the eighteenth century it was the site of the Beckwith shipyard. By the turn of the 20th century it was the site of an amusement park accessible by trolley run by the East Lyme Street Railway. The park operated until 1924.

Topography
The topography of East Lyme consists of rolling hills and lush valleys rounded by glaciers during the last Ice Age. The highest point in town is an unnamed hill with an elevation of  located in Nehantic State Forest in the northwest corner of the town. East Lyme is especially scenic in the summer when the trees are in bloom. On its east and southern sides, the town abuts tidewater. The tidal Niantic River on the east feeds Niantic Bay, an arm of Long Island Sound, which forms the southern edge of the town.

Demographics

As of the census of 2000, there were 18,118 people, 6,308 households, and 4,535 families residing in the town. The racial makeup of the town was 87.29% White, 6.37% African American, 0.44% Native American, 2.82% Asian, 0.04% Pacific Islander, 1.21% from other races, and 1.83% from two or more races. Hispanic or Latino of any race were 4.59% of the population.

There were 6,308 households, out of which 33.1% had children under the age of 18 living with them, 61.0% were married couples living together, 8.4% had a female householder with no husband present, and 28.1% were non-families. 23.3% of all households were made up of individuals, and 8.8% had someone living alone who was 65 years of age or older. The average household size was 2.50 and the average family size was 2.96.

In the town, the population was spread out, with 21.9% under the age of 18, 6.3% from 18 to 24, 33.4% from 25 to 44, 25.8% from 45 to 64, and 12.6% who were 65 years of age or older. The median age was 39 years. For every 100 females, there were 92.7 males. For every 100 females age 18 and over, there were 90.8 males.

The median income for a household in the town was $66,539, and the median income for a family was $74,430. Males had a median income of $53,333 versus $37,162 for females. The per capita income for the town was $28,765. About 1.7% of families and 2.9% of the population were below the poverty line, including 3.0% of those under age 18 and 3.5% of those age 65 or over.

Schools

The town's public schools are operated by the East Lyme School District.

The school district consists of one high school, East Lyme High School; one middle school, East Lyme Middle School (grades 5–8); and three elementary schools:
Flanders Elementary School (grades Pre-K–4),
Lillie B. Haynes Elementary School (grades Pre-K–4), and
Niantic Center School (grades K–4).
East Lyme High School has been recognized by Newsweek magazine as one of the top 1,000 high schools in the country and by U.S. News & World Report as one of the top 500 high schools in the United States. In 2017, the East Lyme High School earned a National Blue Ribbon Distinction by U.S. Department of Education. The awards are for schools that continue to show high achievement or make strong progress toward closing achievements gaps.

East Lyme High School hosts the East Lyme Aquatic & Fitness Center. The center contains an eight-lane, competition swimming and diving pool, and a fitness facility with Nautilus equipment, free weights, and a cardiovascular line. The facility is used by high school swimming and diving teams as well as being open to the public, on a fee basis, when not in use by the school. East Lyme High School athletic teams have recently won the Class L State Championships in girls volleyball for the 2010 and 2011 seasons, and reached the Class M State Finals in girls tennis in 2012. The baseball team also reached the Class L State finals in 2015 and 2016. The cross country team has achieved unparalleled athletic success at East Lyme, winning three consecutive Class MM State titles in 2017, 2018 & 2019. Students from the neighboring town of Salem also attend East Lyme High School.

The East Lyme Middle School is a 1999–2000 National Blue Ribbon School and a 2004 New England League of Middle Schools Spotlight School. It is also the Connecticut Association of Schools 2013–2014 School of the Year. It includes a high tech computer lab and a spacious library.

The Middle School uses a team program called kivas. A kiva contains a science teacher, a language arts or English teacher, a social studies teacher and a math teacher. Some kivas are smaller and have a math and science teacher and a language arts and social studies teacher. There are 11 kivas consisting of two types: multi-age looping and two-year looping. The last kiva is a world language kiva where students can study French or Spanish.

History

The Thomas Lee House, built , is the oldest house in Connecticut that is still in its primitive state. This building is located in the southwestern section of East Lyme, adjacent to Rocky Neck State Park, at the intersection of Connecticut Route 156 and Giants Neck Road. Co-located on this site is the one-room Little Boston Schoolhouse, which was relocated to its current location from across Route 156. The town features six homes from 1699 or earlier, and the Old Stone Church Burial Ground from 1719 located off Society and Riverview roads.

The area occupied by the town was originally inhabited by the Nehantic people, who maintained villages in the present-day Indian Woods section as well as on Black Point, in the McCook's Beach area and near the Niantic River. The tribe allied itself with the colonists in the 1636 war against the Pequot people. The Nehantic would die out in the mid-19th century. The 1750s Ezra Stiles map shows the Nehantic village in what is now Indian Woods as consisting of "12 or 13 huts".

East Lyme, then a part of Lyme, had several taverns which offered stopping places for travelers such as Sarah Kemble Knight. These included Calkins Tavern on what is now Boston Post Road, Royce's Tavern, and Taber Tavern near present-day I-95. At least 45 Revolutionary War veterans are buried within the borders of East Lyme, and countless more veterans from East Lyme found resting places in upstate New York, New Hampshire and Ohio. Moses Warren, along with General Samuel Holden Parsons originally of Lyme and Moses Cleaveland, set out to survey the Ohio Territory in the latter part of the 1790s and has Warren County, Ohio named after him.

Notable locations

 Morton Freeman Plant Hunting Lodge – built in 1908, added to the National Register of Historic Places in 1988.
 Samuel Smith House – built in 1685, added to the National Register of Historic Places in 1979.
 Smith-Harris House – built in 1845, this Greek Revival home was added as the "Thomas Avery House" to the National Register of Historic Places in 1979.
 Thomas Lee House – built , added to the National Register of Historic Places in 1970. One of the oldest houses in the state.
 William Gorton Farm – added to the National Register of Historic Places in 1984.

Media

Library
The first library was started in 1888 and was called the Niantic Library and Reading Room Association. There were 65 founding members. In 1897 the library was formally incorporated as "The Niantic Public Library Association" by the state of Connecticut. The library moved a few times until a permanent structure was built in 1920 on Main Street. In 1966 a wing was added, and in 1979 another addition was added. In 1990 the library moved into the new Community Center/Library complex, where it exists today.

Radio
FM station WNLC is based in East Lyme.

Movies

Portions of the movie Disaster on the Coastliner, released 29 October 1979, were filmed in East Lyme. In 2016, East Lyme was used as a filming location for the Lifetime Thriller, Hunter's Cove. Hunter's Cove was renamed Stalker's Prey when it was released on 9 February 2017.

Economy
According to 2009 statistics 42.2 percent of the town's business was focused in the services industry. A service industry is a business that focuses on retail, food services, distribution, and transportation. The second largest sector is the trade industry with 23.1% of the town's business, followed by construction and mining which accounts for 12.5% of the town businesses.

The largest single employer in town is the state of Connecticut's Department of Corrections which runs two prisons in the west end of town: York Correctional Facility for women, which houses over 1,000 inmates and is staffed by over 500 personnel, and the Gates Correctional Institute for men, which houses about 900 inmates and is staffed by 288 people.

Beaches

Public beaches

 Rocky Neck State Park – a state park comprising East Beach and West Beach
 McCook Park Beach – locally known as "McCook's", located on the western side of McCook Point Park, and immediately adjacent to the private Crescent Beach. This beach, along with its associated public park, was acquired by the town of East Lyme in 1953 from the estate of the McCook Family. This beach is open to the public, on a fee basis, between Memorial Day and Labor Day, and is open free of charge during all other times. Access to this beach is controlled via locked gate. The normal park hours are 8:00 a.m. until dusk each day.
 Hole-in-the-Wall Beach – an approximately  beach that adjoins McCook Point Park. It is open to the public, on a fee basis, between Memorial Day and Labor Day. The normal park hours are 8:00 a.m. until dusk. Access is through a walkway underneath railroad tracks used by Amtrak's Northeast Corridor. The tunnel is located at the end of Baptist Lane. Free public parking is available, but entrance to the beach is monitored during the summer to ensure people entering have paid for access. It also provides access to the Niantic Beach Boardwalk that was built along the shoreline connecting with Railroad Beach. The Overlook parallels the north shore of Niantic Bay and runs adjacent to the Northeast Corridor Amtrak line and consists of an elevated boardwalk and a level stone-dust-filled walkway.
 Railroad Beach – the beach at the eastern end of the Niantic Bay Overlook, locally known as "Railroad Beach" due to its proximity with the Niantic Railroad Drawbridge and the Amtrak Northeast Corridor mainline. Access to this beach is from the Niantic Bay Overlook via Hole-in-the-Wall Beach or from Cini Park via the walkway under the railroad drawbridge.

Private beaches

 Crescent Beach – adjacent to McCooks; reserved for homeowners in the area
 Oak Grove Beach
 Black Point Beach – for members of the Black Point Beach Club Association
 Old Black Point Beach – for homeowners in Old Black Point. 
 Attawan Beach – adjacent to Black Point; for homeowners in the Attawan Beach Community
 Giants Neck Heights Beach – for members of the Giants Neck Heights Association. Located at the southeastern end of the Rocky Neck beach. It features a jetty that is popular with local crabbers and amateur photographers—and seagulls who drop clams and mussels on the cement surface to crack them open for eating. Use of this beach is restricted to the approximately 400 homeowners of the Giants Neck Height Association.
 Pine Grove – For members of the Pine Grove Beach Association 
 Oswegatchie Hills Club – For the families living in Saunders Point, between Smith Cove and Niantic Bay.

Notable people

 William Colepaugh (1918–2005), Nazi sympathizer who grew up on Black Point and traveled to Germany in 1944 to be trained as a spy
 Tom Danielson (born 1978), professional cyclist for Team Garmin, finishing 8th in the 2011 Tour de France
 Rajai Davis (born 1980), Major League Baseball player for the Cleveland Indians. Hit a game tying home run in Game 7 of the 2016 World Series against the ultimately victorious Chicago Cubs
 Charles Drake (real name Charles Ruppert) (1917–1994), actor in over 80 films and numerous television shows
 Otto Graham (1921–2003), Hall of Fame professional football player
 Anne Rogers Minor (1864–1947), artist, national president of the Daughters of the American Revolution from 1920 to 1923
 Jay Allen Sanford, author and cartoonist best known as the co-creator of Rock 'N' Roll Comics, and for his work with Revolutionary Comics, Carnal Comics, and the San Diego Reader
 Emily Steel, journalist at The New York Times, whose investigative work forced Fox News commentator Bill O'Reilly out of the network in April 2017
 James Stevenson (illustrator) (1929–2017). illustrator and author of over 100 children's books whose cartoons appear regularly in The New Yorker
 Ed Toth, drummer currently with The Doobie Brothers, formerly with Vertical Horizon and Jennifer Culture
 Jeremy Powers, East Lyme native and former professional racing cyclist, who possesses the most wins by an American male cyclo-cross rider
 Vladimir Peter Tytla (1904–1968), known as Bill Tytla, one of the original Disney animators

Places of worship

 Christ Lutheran Church; 24 Society Road, Niantic, CT 06357; Lutheran Church Missouri Synod
 Lighthouse Assembly of God; 315 Flanders Road, East Lyme, CT 06333; Assemblies of God
 Flanders Baptist Church; 138 Boston Post Road, East Lyme, CT 06333; Baptist
 Saint Matthias Church; 317 Chesterfield Road, East Lyme, CT 06333; Roman Catholic
 Saint Matthias Parish Center; 317 Chesterfield Road, East Lyme, CT 06333; Roman Catholic
 Miracle Temple Church; 18 Dean Road, East Lyme, CT 06333; Non-denominational
 Niantic Community Church; 170 Pennsylvania Avenue, Niantic CT 06357; United Methodist Church & United Church of Christ
 Saint Agnes Church; 22 Haigh Avenue, Niantic, CT 06357; Roman Catholic
 Niantic Baptist Church; 443 Main Street, Niantic, CT 06357; Baptist
 Saint John's Episcopal Church; 400 Main Street, Niantic, CT 06357; Episcopal

Cemeteries

Active

East Lyme Cemetery, Boston Post Road
Stone Church, intersection of Society and Riverview roads, Niantic
Union Cemetery, East Pattagansett Road, Niantic

References

External links

Town of East Lyme official website
East Lyme Public Library 
Children's Museum of Southeastern Connecticut

 
Towns in New London County, Connecticut
Populated coastal places in Connecticut
Towns in Connecticut
1839 establishments in Connecticut